Martretia is a genus of plants in the family Phyllanthaceae first described as a genus in 1907. It contains only one known species, Martretia quadricornis, native to western and central Africa from Sierra Leone to Zaire. It is dioecious, with male and female flowers on separate plants.

References

Phyllanthaceae
Phyllanthaceae genera
Monotypic Malpighiales genera
Flora of West Tropical Africa
Flora of West-Central Tropical Africa
Dioecious plants